The Socialist Patriotic Youth League is a North Korean youth organization. It is the main youth organization in North Korea. Directly under the party Central Committee, it is the only mass organization expressly mentioned in the charter of the Workers' Party of Korea. Youth under 15 may join the Young Pioneer Corps, itself a part of the larger Korean Children's Union. The organization, modeled after the Komsomol in the former Soviet Union, includes all North Koreans without party membership between the ages of 15 and 30, although married women who opt to become housewives are transferred to the Socialist Women's Union. Officially, the guiding ideology of the organization is Kimilsungism–Kimjongilism.

History 

The League was founded by Kim Il-sung on 17 January 1946 as the Democratic Youth League of North Korea. It became the youth wing of the Workers' Party of North Korea, later the Workers' Party of Korea. Six months after its foundation in June 1946, the League joined the World Federation of Democratic Youth, establishing international relations with other progressive youth movements. It was renamed the Democratic Youth League of Korea and in May 1964 renamed as the League of Socialist Working Youth of Korea. It assumed the name Kim Il-sung Socialist Youth League on its 50th anniversary in 1996.

The 8th congress of the youth league was held in February 1993, after a 12-year lapse since the 7th congress, held in 1981. The last conference was held on 12 July 2012, after ten years since the previous one, held on 21–22 March 2002. The 9th congress has been convened for January 2016, after 23 years since the previous one.

On 4 January 2007, in Pyongyang, Kim Song-chol, the First Secretary of the Pyongyang Municipal People's Committee of the KSYL gave a speech at a mass rally, with other high government officials, praising Songun Korea. During the speech, Kim Song-chol said that the country should bolster "death-defying corps" and create a "youth vanguard faithfully following the Party's Songun politics."

The 47th plenary meeting of the Central Committee of the KSYL was held, in Pyongyang, on 22 March 2012. At the meeting, former First Secretary Ri Yong-chol was relieved of his post due to his age and Jon Yong-nam was elected to the post. The current head of the league is Chairman of the Central Committee .

Recently, Choe Ryong-hae has been replacing military officials with KSYL members.

The Kim Il-sung Socialist Youth League was renamed as the Kimilsungist-Kimjongilist Youth League at its 9th Congress held on 27–28 August 2016. It was renamed as the Socialist Patriotic Youth League at its 10th Congress held on 27–28 April 2021, with the aims of reflecting its nature as a reserve force to socialist construction.

Duties 

Within the government, the league coordinates the national youth policy of North Korea together with other youth-serving ministries, such as the Ministry of Education. The league plays an important role in the planning, implementation and evaluation of this national youth policy and serves as a national youth platform to link both the governmental and nongovernmental youth-related organizations and activities in this over-all national youth policy. The league is the party's most important ideological and organizational training ground, with branches and cells wherever there are regular party organizations. "Youth league cells exist in the army, factories, cooperative farms, schools, cultural institutions, and government agencies."

The youth movement shifted its focus after Kim Il-sung's death and expanded its ideological indoctrination to include the "revolutionary accomplishments" of Kim Jong-il and the "brilliance" of Songun.

"The KSYL, by restricting the ideological culture and organized groups of all youths, monitors any changes in the society’s way of thinking that may happen with the change of generations. It also organizes all youths to be actively involved in production, construction, and military service. The KSYL plays the important role of restricting any form of opposition groups or actions among the youth of North Korea", according to Ken E. Gause.

The league's official newspaper is the Chongnyon Jonwi. It also has a sports team, Hwaebul Sports Club.

Maintenance of Social Order Brigade 
Members of the league perform spot checks to see if North Koreans are maintaining ideological purity. Prohibited actions include not wearing a Kim Il-sung badge or wearing a T-shirt with Roman writing.

See also 

 Ernst Thälmann Pioneer Organisation
 Free German Youth
 Komsomol
 Communist Youth League of China
 Red Guards
 Vladimir Lenin All-Union Pioneer Organization

References

External links 
  – the official newspaper of the league 

Youth organizations established in 1946
Youth wings of communist parties
Workers' Party of Korea